Iván Aguilar Díaz (born 12 June 1991) is a Spanish professional footballer who plays for Linares as a forward.

Football career
Born in Benalmádena, Province of Málaga, Andalusia, Aguilar finished his formation with local Málaga CF, making his senior debuts with the B-team in the 2010–11 season, in Tercera División. In April 2011 he signed a new two-year deal with the Andalusians, appearing with the main squad in the pre-season match against Valencia CF in September.

In August 2012, free agent Aguilar went on trial at MSV Duisburg. Nothing came of it, however, and he joined SC Austria Lustenau in Austria. He appeared in his first game as a professional on 21 September, playing the last two minutes of a 0–0 away draw against Kapfenberger SV for the Football First League championship.

On 19 August 2013, after only one season, Aguilar returned to Spain, signing with freshly relegated club Xerez CD. In January of the following year, as he was his side's top scorer with 13 goals in only 14 matches, he moved to Gimnàstic de Tarragona in Segunda División B, being assigned to their farm team.

On 28 July 2014, Aguilar moved to CD San Roque de Lepe also in the third level, in a season-long loan deal. Roughly a year later, he was loaned to fellow league team UCAM Murcia CF for one year, scoring 14 times – play-offs included – in his debut campaign to help them reach Segunda División for the first time ever.

On 30 August 2016, Aguilar terminated his contract with the Murcians, and joined Recreativo Huelva. He subsequently represented UD Logroñés, Mérida AD and Antequera CF, scoring a career-best 20 goals for the latter.

On 20 June 2019, Aguilar moved to Gibraltar to sign for league champions Lincoln Red Imps. He played a UEFA Champions League first qualifying game five days later – a 1–0 loss at KF Feronikeli of Kosovo – and went back across the border on 8 July when he signed for fourth-tier Linares Deportivo.

References

External links

1991 births
Living people
Sportspeople from the Province of Málaga
Spanish footballers
Footballers from Andalusia
Association football forwards
Segunda División players
Segunda División B players
Tercera División players
Atlético Malagueño players
Xerez CD footballers
CF Pobla de Mafumet footballers
Gimnàstic de Tarragona footballers
CD San Roque de Lepe footballers
UCAM Murcia CF players
Recreativo de Huelva players
UD Logroñés players
Mérida AD players
Antequera CF footballers
Lincoln Red Imps F.C. players
2. Liga (Austria) players
SC Austria Lustenau players
Spanish expatriate footballers
Expatriate footballers in Austria
Expatriate footballers in Gibraltar
Spanish expatriate sportspeople in Austria
Spanish expatriate sportspeople in Gibraltar